Napoleonaea vogelii is an evergreen shrub or a low-branching tree with a dense crown growing up to 15 metres tall. It grows in Sierra Leone, Liberia, and Cote D'Ivoire. The bark is used locally to flavour rice and to chew with cola nuts as a stimulant.

References

vogelii
Flora of Angola
Flora of Guinea